Uta Schütz (born 8 August 1955) is a German former swimmer. She competed in three events at the 1972 Summer Olympics.

References

External links
 

1955 births
Living people
German female swimmers
Olympic swimmers of West Germany
Swimmers at the 1972 Summer Olympics
People from Bergstraße (district)
Sportspeople from Darmstadt (region)